River Hills may refer to:

River Hills, Manitoba, Canada
River Hills, Wisconsin, United States
River Hills, South Carolina, United States

See also
River Hill (disambiguation)